Eino Ilmari "Illu" Juutilainen (21 February 1914 – 21 February 1999) was a fighter pilot of the Ilmavoimat (Finnish Air Force), and the top scoring non-German fighter pilot of all time. The top flying ace of the Finnish Air Force, he led all Finnish pilots in score against Soviet aircraft in World War II (1939–40 and 1941–44), with 94 confirmed aerial combat victories (he himself claimed further kills for a total of 126 victories, but these were unconfirmed) in 437 sorties. He achieved 34 of his victories while flying the Brewster Buffalo fighter.

One of the four double recipients of the Mannerheim Cross 2nd Class, Juutilainen was born in Lieksa, and died in Tuusula. His brother was the Finnish Army Captain Aarne Juutilainen, nicknamed "The Terror of Morocco".

Summary
Juutilainen flew Fokker D.XXI, Brewster Buffalo, and Messerschmitt Bf 109 fighters. He finished the war without a single hit to his plane from enemy fighter airplanes (once he was forced to land after a friendly anti-aircraft gun fired at his Bf 109). Like Japanese fighter ace Saburō Sakai, Juutilainen never lost a wingman in combat. He also scored the first radar-assisted victory in the Finnish Air Force on 24 March 1943, when he was guided to a Soviet Pe-2 by a German radar operator, who was testing out the freshly delivered radar sets, that officially became operational 3 days later.

Military career
Juutilainen entered the Finnish military on 9 September 1932 for his compulsory military service, serving as a pilot in the Finnish Air Force starting in 1935. On 1 May 1935, Juutilainen was promoted to sergeant. He was transferred to LeLv 24, operating from Utti, on March 3, 1939. In October 1939, with the situation worsening, the squadron moved to Immola, closer to the Finnish-Soviet frontier. During the Winter War (which broke on 30 November 1939) Juutilainen flew the Fokker D.XXI. He scored his first victory on 19 December 1939, shooting down an Ilyushin DB-3 bomber and damaging two more. At the end of the Winter War, Juutilainen had achieved one shared and two individual victories.
During the Continuation War, Juutilainen served in 3/LeLv 24, flying a Brewster B-239 "Buffalo".

On 21 July 1941, Juutilainen and five other Buffaloes scrambled to intercept Soviet fighters from 65th ShAP that were strafing Finnish troops near Käkisalmi. During that sortie, he destroyed a Polikarpov I-153 'Chaika', making him an "ace" in the Brewster Buffalo.

A few days later, on 1 August, seven fighters under the command of First Lieutenant Karhunen destroyed six I-16s near Rautjärvi, and  Juutilainen (having been promoted to Warrant Officer in the meantime) claimed two of them.

On the morning of 6 February 1942, while reconnoitering the Petrovkiy-Jam region with other LLv 24 pilots, Juutilainen intercepted seven Tupolev SB bombers escorted by 12 MiG-3s. Juutilainen claimed two SBs.

Juutilainen later recalled:

On 27–28 March 1942, 3/LLv 24 moved to Immola in preparation for a Finnish Army offensive on Suursaari, in the Gulf of Finland. Although grossly outnumbered over the Gulf of Finland, LeLv 24 pilots were more experienced than their Soviet opponents from Red Banner Baltic Fleet. Even when they had the advantage of surprise and height, Soviet pilots did not succeed in shooting down Finnish pilots.

On 28 March, WO Juutilainen, in patrol with Sgt Huotari, attacked some "Chaikas"  of 11 IAP over the Suurkyla shoreline, at Hogland, and shot down two of them. These air victories took Juutilainen's tally to 22. A month later, on 26 April, he became his unit's first recipient of the Mannerheim Cross.

On 20 September, he took off with Capt Jorma Karhunen and 3/LeLv 24 pilots for a patrol of the Kronstadt--Seiskari region. Near the Estonian coast, they were bounced by ten Soviet fighters. But the Finnish quickly reacted and managed to down three of their opponents. WO Juutilainen was credited with two kills.

All in all, Juutilainen scored 34 victories in Brewster B-239, 28 of them (including three triple kills) between 9 July 1941 and 22 November 1942, in his BW-364 "Orange 4".

In 1943, Juutilainen was transferred to LeLv 34, which used new Messerschmitt Bf 109G-2s. With the Bf 109, he shot down a further 58 enemy planes. He shot down six Soviet airplanes on 30 June 1944 (all confirmed on Soviet loss records), becoming an ace in a day and parallelling Jorma Sarvanto's score on 6 January 1940 in the Winter War.

Juutilainen refused an officer commission, fearing it would keep him from flying.

His 94th and last victory was a Li-2, the Russian version of the Douglas C-47, shot down on 3 September 1944 over the Karelian Isthmus.

Post-war
After the wars, Juutilainen served in the air force until 1947. He worked as a professional pilot until 1956, flying people in his De Havilland Moth. His last flight was in 1997, at age 83, in a two-seat F-18 Hornet of the Finnish Air Force.

Juutilainen died at home in Tuusula (Tusby) on his 85th birthday on 21 February 1999.

Victories

References

Notes

Bibliography
 Juutilainen, Eino Ilmari (translated by Nikunen, Heikki). Double Fighter Knight. Tampere, Finland: Apali Oy, 1996. . Juutilainen's memoirs that were published in English in 1996.
 Keskinen, Kalevi; Stenman, Kari and Niska, Klaus. Hävittäjä-ässät (Finnish Fighter Aces). Espoo, Finland: Tietoteas, 1978. . (Finnish)
 Jackson, Robert. Air Aces Of WWII. Ramsbury, Marlborough, Airlife, 2003.  .
 Stenman, Kari and Andrew Thomas.  Brewster F2A Buffalo Aces of World War 2 (Aircraft of the Aces 91). Oxford UK/Long Island City NY, Osprey Publishing, 2010. .

 Stenman, Kari and Keskinen, Kalevi. Finnish Aces of World War 2 (Aircraft of the Aces 23). Oxford, UK: Osprey Publishing, 1998. .

External links
 Tarrif.net – Interview with Ilmari Juutilainen
 Ilmari Juutilainen at Aces of WW2
 Interview with Jon Guttman
 List of World War II aces from Finland

1914 births
1999 deaths
Finnish Air Force personnel
Finnish World War II flying aces
Winter War pilots
Knights of the Mannerheim Cross
Recipients of the Order of the Cross of Liberty, 3rd Class
People from Lieksa
People from Kuopio Province (Grand Duchy of Finland)